Jiří Janoščín (born 8 October 1992, in Brno) is a Czech football player who currently plays for FK Fotbal Třinec on loan from FC Zbrojovka Brno.

References
 Profile at FC Zbrojovka Brno official site
 Profile at FK Fotbal Třinec official site

1992 births
Living people
Footballers from Brno
Czech footballers
Czech First League players
FC Zbrojovka Brno players
1. HFK Olomouc players
FK Fotbal Třinec players
Association football midfielders
Czech National Football League players